Airborne is a 1993 American comedy-drama film about inline skating directed by Rob Bowman and starring Shane McDermott, Seth Green, Brittney Powell, Chris Conrad, Jacob Vargas, and Jack Black.

Plot
Mitchell Goosen is a teenager from California who loves to surf and rollerblade.  His zoologist parents are given the opportunity for grant work in Australia for six months. Eager to accompany his parents to the surf-friendly shores of the South Pacific, he is dismayed to find out that he will not be joining them and instead will be living with his aunt and uncle in Cincinnati, Ohio, to finish the remainder of his high school semester. He arrives in the midst of a winter storm to a blue-collar Midwestern city, quickly coming to the realization that this is far from the free-spirited beach atmosphere that he has been accustomed to. To add to his disillusion, he meets his cousin Wiley, who at first glance is an awkward teenager and whose parents' lifestyle and demeanor, though warm and hospitable, is a bit old-fashioned.

Mitchell is met on his first day at school with obstacles. He is antagonized by the gritty hockey players who chastise Mitchell for his easygoing "Maharishi" philosophy and "California" appearance. The hockey players include Jack, Augie, Snake, Rosenblatt, and the Banduccis. With an upcoming game against the rival "preps", Wiley and subsequently Mitchell are asked to fill-in for two students undergoing punishment for misbehavior. Mitchell inadvertently scores a goal for the preps, cementing the disdain of the hockey players, and in particular Jack, who tackles Mitchell while still on the ice, concussing him and leaving him unconscious for what appears to be hours. Over the course of the next few weeks, Mitchell and Wiley are harassed relentlessly, culminating with Mitchell having a dream which convinces him to peacefully confront the situation.

During the interim, Mitchell falls in love with Nikki. During a double date with his cousin and Nikki's friend Gloria, the leader of the preps, Blane, physically confronts Mitchell, who is only saved when Jack arrives to stand up for Nikki who, as it turns out, is also Jack's sister. Mitchell's dream comes to fruition when he decides to proactively join Jack and his ice hockey brethren for a street hockey game against the preps. Mitchell embarrasses Blane, causing a change of heart from his teammates. Later, Snake, Augie, and the Banduccis solicit Mitchell's help and rollerblading expertise in a race down a harrowing street route termed Devil's Backbone against the preps. It is agreed upon that the first team with three members crossing the finish line will be deemed the winner. An aggressive and athletic Snake reaches the finish first for Mitchell's team, but two preps swiftly follow suit. Needing only one more person to win and with Blane in sight of the end, he decides to barrel into Mitchell but poorly times his attack and instead lands in the waters below. This leaves Jack and Mitchell in clear sight of the finish line, as they approach in tandem victory to the cheers of their awaiting schoolmates, and kisses of respective love interests. Mitchell has finally earned the respect of Jack and his friends, and he is lifted on the shoulders of a cheering crowd.

Cast
 Shane McDermott as Mitchell Goosen
 Seth Green as Wiley Metzner
 Brittney Powell as Nikki
 Chris Conrad as Jack
 Edie McClurg as Irene Metzner
 Patrick O'Brien as Louie Metzner
 Jack Black as Jose Augusto Rafael "Augie" de la Parra
 Alanna Ubach as Gloria
 Jacob Vargas as "Snake"
 Owen Stadele as Blane
 Jessica Boevers as Alexis
 Chris Edwards as Walt
 Daniel Betances as Tony Banducci
 David Betances as Mark Banducci
 Travis Hafer as Ice Skating / Roller Hockey Extra
 Christian McVeigh as "Supermac"

Reception

Critical
On the review aggregator website Rotten Tomatoes, it holds a 21% approval rating, based on 14 reviews, with an average rating of 2.74/10. The website's consensus reads, "Airborne skates downhill with a threadbare story, flat characters, and wince-inducing dialogue."

In a review for the Los Angeles Times, Chris Willman commended the production team for their efforts, praising cinematographer Okada for giving the film "a surprising natural light look" and composer Copeland for providing "a well above average rock score", and giving huge credit to second unit director Steve Boyum, stunt coordinator Pat Parnell and the skaters for making the skating scenes and finale "inherently cinematic".

Willman added that, "Off the skates, it's at best mediocre Nickelodeon fare", writing that "[A]s the first major filmic celebration of in line skating and holy Rollerbladers, Airborne (citywide) is hell on wheels and itchy limbo off. The occasional action scenes are as appropriately tortuous as the tired teen out of water plot is torturous. This is a kid flick that's speed skating on one leg."

The New York Timess Stephen Holden called it "a modest attempt to take a familiar genre, the surf movie, and spin it into a new subgenre, the Rollerblades film."

Box office
The film was released in 982 theaters. It made $2,850,263 domestically, and $1,262,239 in its opening weekend.

References

External links

1993 films
American comedy-drama films
American teen comedy films
Roller skating films
Films set in Cincinnati
Films shot in Ohio
Icon Productions films
Warner Bros. films
Films directed by Rob Bowman
Films produced by Bruce Davey
Films scored by Stewart Copeland
1993 directorial debut films
1990s English-language films
1990s American films